AS Adema 149–0 SO l'Emyrne was a football match played on 31 October 2002 between two teams in Toamasina, Madagascar.  It holds the world record for the highest scoreline in any football match, recognised by The Guinness Book of Records.  SO l'Emyrne (SOE) intentionally lost the game against their arch-rivals AS Adema in a pre-planned protest over refereeing decisions that had gone against them during a previous four-team playoff tournament. By some considerable margin, the match surpassed the previous-highest scoreline when Arbroath beat Bon Accord 36–0 in the Scottish Cup in 1885. As of 2023, that match remains the largest victory margin in a legitimate game.

Overview
The match was part of a four-team round-robin play-off to determine the national championship. The league crown went to Adema after SOE, who were defending champions, was held to a 2–2 draw by DSA Antananarivo in their penultimate match, during which the referee awarded a late and disputed penalty to SOE, resulting in a draw.

That draw meant that SOE was knocked out of the title race. With the championship already decided, SOE decided to protest; according to some sources, there was an argument between the SOE coach and the referee himself. SOE deliberately scored 149 own goals, with spectators saying that after each kick-off, the ball was kicked into their own goal with the opposition players standing and looking bemused. It was reported that spectators descended on the ticket booths to demand a refund.

Following the match, the Malagasy Football Federation (FMF) suspended SOE coach Zaka Ratsarazaka for three years and four of the team's players, SOE captain Manitranirina Andrianiaina, goalkeeper Dominique Rakotonandrasana, Mamisoa Razafindrakoto (who was the captain of the Madagascar national football team) and Nicolas Rakotoarimanana, were suspended until the end of the season and banned from visiting stadiums for the same period. All other players from both teams received a warning and a threat of more serious action should they commit further offenses.

The referee was not punished, as the situation was deemed to be out of his control, while Madagascar's sports ministry proceeded to dissolve the FMF, which was later reconstituted.

See also
Barbados 4–2 Grenada, where a Barbadian defender deliberately scored an own goal so his team could win by two goals in extra time according to an unconventional golden goal rule
Thailand 3–2 Indonesia, where an Indonesian defender deliberately scored an own goal to avoid his team facing hosts Vietnam in the semi-finals of the 1998 AFF Championship

References

External links

Association football controversies
Record association football wins
Football in Madagascar
2002 in Malagasy sport
2002 in African football
October 2002 sports events in Africa
2002 protests
Protests in Africa
Controversies in Africa
Highest-scoring association football matches